The 1989 Speedway World Team Cup was the 30th edition of the FIM Speedway World Team Cup to determine the team world champions.

The final was staged at Odsal Stadium, Bradford, England. The English team dominated the meeting, following near tragedy for Denmark. Jeremy Doncaster, Kelvin Tatum, Paul Thorp and Simon Wigg defeated Denmark, Sweden and the USA in a single meeting final. The Danish run of sixth consecutive titles finally came to an end and England once more went top of the all time list, with nine titles.

The World Cup Final saw the end of the career of three time World Champion Erik Gundersen of Denmark. In the first race of the meeting, Gundersen won the start from gate 4 and headed the field into the first turn. His engine suddenly seized causing his bike to lock up he was knocked off by the rider behind. As he lay on the race track he was hit in the head by another rider's rear wheel. After the accident he was not expected to live and he remained in coma for a period of time but he eventually regained consciousness. Gundersen had to learn to walk again and raised a large amount of money for the Bradford Royal Infirmary which saved his life and he later became manager of the Danish Speedway Team. None of the riders involved in the accident - Gundersen, Simon Cross (Eng), Jimmy Nilsen (SWE) and Lance King (USA), took any further part in the final and Denmark were clearly affected by the accident.

Qualification

Group D
 Venues: Shumen, Bulgaria and Sandes, Holland

Norway to Group C.

Group C
 Venues : Lonigo, Italy and Wiener Neustadt, Austria

Italy to Group B.

Group B
 Venues : Nyiregyhaza, Hungary and Rzeszów, Poland

Australia to Group A.

Group A
 Venues : Diedenbergen, Germany and Prague, Czechoslovakia

Sweden to Final.

World final

Venue : Bradford, England

See also
 1989 Individual Speedway World Championship
 1989 Speedway World Pairs Championship

References

Speedway World Team Cup
1989 in speedway